Kabre, Janakpur  is a village development committee in Dolakha District in the Janakpur Zone of north-eastern Nepal. At the time of the 1991 Nepal census it had a population of 4,235 people living in 894 individual households.

References
house hold 1180
total population 5781 in 064 B.s. v.d.c. name is Kabre

External links
UN map of the municipalities of Dolakha District

Populated places in Dolakha District